Jalon may refer to:

Jalón, a municipality in Alicante province, Spain
Jalón (river), a tributary of the river Ebro in Spain
Jalón de Cameros, a municipality in La Rioja, Spain

Jâlons, a commune in the Marne department, France
Jalon Linton, a cricketer from the Cayman Islands
Jalon Daniels (born 1995), American football player
Jalon (biblical figure), a minor biblical figure

See also
 Jalen, a given name and surname